Balagachchy (Balağaççı) is a rural locality (a selo), the administrative centre of and one of two settlements, in addition to Seyat, in Togussky Rural Okrug of Vilyuysky District in the Sakha Republic, Russia. Its population as of the 2010 Census was 601, of whom 288 were male and 313 female, down from 668 as recorded during the 2002 Census.

References

Notes

Sources
Official website of the Sakha Republic. Registry of the Administrative-Territorial Divisions of the Sakha Republic. Vilyuysky District. 

Rural localities in Vilyuysky District